The Landor Theatre is a pub theatre in Clapham, South London.

Originally the Cage Theatre upon its opening in 1994, the Landor became "Upstairs at the Landor" in 1995 and finally the Landor Theatre in 1998, following a refit of the building.

In 2010 the Landor staged productions of Smokey Joe's Cafe, Closer Than Ever and Tomorrow Morning. In 2013 it staged the London premiere of title of show starring Scott Garnham as Hunter.

References

External links

Theatres in the London Borough of Lambeth
Pub theatres in London
Pub theatres in England